A moped is a type of small motorcycle, generally having a less stringent licensing requirement than full motorcycles or automobiles. The term used to mean a similar vehicle except with both bicycle pedals and a motorcycle engine. Mopeds typically travel only a bit faster than bicycles on public roads. Mopeds are distinguished from motor scooters in that the latter tend to be more powerful and subject to more regulation.

Some mopeds have a step-through frame design, while others have motorcycle frame designs, including a backbone and a raised fuel tank, mounted directly between the saddle and the head tube. Some resemble motorized bicycles. Most are similar to a regular motorcycle but with pedals and a crankset that may be used with or instead of motor drive. Although mopeds usually have two wheels, some jurisdictions classify low-powered three- or four-wheeled vehicles (including ATVs and go-kart) as a moped.

In some countries, a moped can be any motorcycle with an engine capacity below  (most commonly  or lower).

Etymology

The claimed derivation from the term motor-velocipede is incorrect. According to Douglas Harper, the Swedish terms originated from "(trampcykel med) mo(tor och) ped(aler)", which means "pedal cycle with engine and pedals" (the earliest versions had auxiliary pedals). Like some of the earliest two wheeled motorcycles, all mopeds were once equipped with bicycle pedals.

The term moped has now been applied by some regional governments to vehicles without pedals such as motor scooters, based on criteria of restricted engine displacement, speed, and/or power output.  This is a misnomer, as they are no longer "mopeds" at all, and might instead be called a "noped" if they appear to look exactly like a typical moped, but no longer include pedals.

History

The term "moped" now only applies to low-power (often super-economy) vehicles, but pedals were fitted to some early motorcycles, such as the pictured 1912 Douglas. Pedaling away from stationary was a great improvement over "run and jump" and light pedal assistance (LPA) was valuable for climbing hills. Better transmissions with wider ranges, better clutches and much better engine performance made pedals obsolete on most motorcycles by 1918 but the pedals on mopeds remained valuable for their original purposes as late as the 1990s.

The earliest mopeds were bicycles with a helper motor in various locations, for example on top of the front wheel; they were also called cyclemotors. An example of that type is the VéloSoleX brand, which simply has a roller driving the front tire.

A more innovative design was known in the UK as the Cyclemaster. This had a complete powered rear wheel which was simply substituted for the bicycle rear wheel, which originated from a design by two DKW engineers in Germany. Slightly larger machines, commonly with a  engine were known as autocycles. On the other hand, some mopeds, such as the Czech-made Jawa, were derived from motorcycles.

A further category of low-powered two-wheelers exists today in some jurisdictions for bicycles with helper motors – these are often defined as power-assisted bicycles or motorized bicycles. Other jurisdictions may categorize the same machines as mopeds, creating a certain amount of confusion. In many countries three-wheelers and microcars are classified as mopeds or variations thereof. This practice is not restricted to the third world; France and Belgium classify microcars such as the Aixam similarly or as "light quadricycles".  The Ariel 3, a motorised three-wheeler is classed as a moped.

In 1977, the Vienna Convention on Road Traffic considers the moped  any two-wheeled or three-wheeled vehicle which is fitted with an internal combustion engine having a cylinder capacity not exceeding 50 cc.

Emissions

The emissions of mopeds have been the subject of multiple studies. Studies have found that two-stroke 50 cc mopeds, with and without catalytic converters, emit ten to thirty times the hydrocarbons and particulate emissions of the outdated Euro 3 automobile standards. In the same study, four-stroke mopeds, with and without catalytic converters, emitted three to eight times the hydrocarbons and particulate emissions of the Euro 3 automobile standards. Approximate parity with automobiles was achieved with NOx emissions in these studies. Emissions performance was tested on a g/km basis and was unaffected by fuel economy. An additional air quality problem can also arise from the use of moped and scooter transportation over automobiles, as a higher density of motorized vehicles can be supported by existing transportation infrastructure.

Safety

Safely riding a moped mostly requires the same considerations as safely riding a motorcycle. However the lower speeds reduce some dangers and increase others. The biggest danger is that other traffic may not notice the presence of a moped; bright clothes and reflective fittings help. Drivers may even see the moped, recognize it as harmless to them and simply forget it is there, pulling out of side-turnings into its path. Similarly, a car approaching a moped from behind will approach it more quickly than the driver expects, and the driver's attention may be more attuned to other automobile traffic rather than the moped, increasing the likelihood of an accident. This is a particular problem for mopeds used on high-speed roads where they may not be intended to travel.

Mopeds are often illegally tuned for higher speeds, powers or engine displacements than allowed. For this to be legal, such vehicles should be re-registered as motorcycles, and their driver's license requirements, taxes, insurance costs, and minimum driver age would be higher. A tuned vehicle, not designed for higher speeds, is not as safe as a purpose-designed motorcycle. A survey of Finnish high school vocational and gymnasium students found that 80% and 70% of their respective mopeds were tuned. Only 10% of trade school students had a moped that conformed to legislation. The average maximum speed was 72 km/h, far higher than the legally allowable 45 km/h. Another study reported that of school-age moped owners, 50% of boys and 15% of girls have an illegally tuned moped.

Individual countries/regions

Sports moped

In the United Kingdom during the 1970s, a high-performance derivation of the moped concept was developed, aimed at 16-year-olds. It was created in order to circumvent governmental legislation aimed at forcing young motorcycle riders off the road. These new laws, called the "Sixteener Law", were introduced by John Peyton, the then Conservative Party Minister for Transport in 1971. They forbade 16-year-olds from riding motorcycles of up to  capacity as they had done before, and limited them to  machines until they were 17. The law provoked motorcycle manufacturers to develop new class of motorcycle which were then called "sports mopeds" or, colloquially, "sixteener specials" and was subject to much criticism. The market for these was primarily young males.

Models were produced by Japanese manufacturers Honda, Yamaha and Suzuki, and European companies such as Puch, Fantic, Gilera, Gitane and Garelli from 1972 onwards, the most famous of which was the Yamaha FS1-E. They included roadsters, enduro and motorcrossers, cafe racers and choppers or scooters, and led to a boom interest in motorcycling similar to the early 1960 rocker period. The move contributed to the demise of the UK motorcycle market. In Continental Europe no such restrictions existed and such vehicles could be ridden by 14-year-olds.

See also

Daelim (Trac)
Honda
Jawa Moto
Moped Army
Motobecane
 Personal transporter 
Peugeot
Piaggio
Puch
Rabasa Cycles (Derbi)
ZF Sachs
Tomos
Vespa

References

External links

 

 
Motorcycle classifications
Swedish words and phrases